Frederick Feast (5 October 1929 – 25 June 1999) was a British television actor, best remembered for playing the role of Fred Gee in Coronation Street.

Early life
He attended the Scarborough High School for Boys, Scarborough, North Riding of Yorkshire, and served as a physical training instructor for the Parachute Regiment with the rank of sergeant. He worked as a variety artist and stand-up comic at the Windmill Theatre and appeared in summer seasons and pantomimes. Other occupations included driving instructor, butcher, trawlerman, dolphin trainer, computer systems analyst, nightclub owner, personal shopper, publican and maître d' at a Michelin star Algarve restaurant.

Early roles
Feast acted in numerous television dramas throughout the 1960s and early 1970s, including the BAFTA winning ITV play Another Sunday and Sweet FA, written by Jack Rosenthal. He also had guest roles in a string of popular serials including Nearest and Dearest, Country Matters, South Riding and the mining drama Sam (1973), where he played the character Chopper for two episodes. He appeared in the Ken Loach directed wartime series Days of Hope (1975), written by Jim Allen. He also appeared in Crown Court.

Coronation Street
Feast was best known for his role as the Rovers Return's potman Fred Gee in the soap opera Coronation Street, a role he played from 1975 to 1984.

In 1983, Feast took time off sick at a moment's notice, causing the Coronation Street script writers to have to re-draft 12 episodes (then the equivalent of six weeks of programmes). He claimed to be depressed, had trouble remembering his lines, and suffered from bouts of uncontrollable weeping. Producer Bill Podmore later said that if he had come to him and explained this in the first place, his role could have been temporarily reduced; appearing as a barman in the Rovers, the focal point of Coronation Street, means that an actor tends to be in more scenes than other characters. Podmore described Feast as "earthy", and Fred Gee as being a toned-down screen version of Fred Feast.

When Feast next took time off, it was permanent. On the show, Fred Gee had gone from being an unlikable loser to an outright buffoon, getting the sack from Rovers landlord Billy Walker (Kenneth Farrington) after punching him in the face, unable to see that Walker had goaded him into it so he could sack him without having to pay him any redundancy. Business deals behind the back of London textile magnate Mike Baldwin (Johnny Briggs) also backfired. Feast refused to sign a new contract, stating in the British national press that he didn't want to become "another Coronation Street cabbage", which some took as a tasteless reference to cast members Peter Dudley, Jack Howarth and Bernard Youens (who played Bert Tilsley, Albert Tatlock and Stan Ogden respectively), all of whom had recently died.

Fred Gee last appeared in the soap in November 1984. His departure went unremarked upon, and his position at the Rovers was taken by Jack Duckworth (William Tarmey).

When the character's wife Eunice (Meg Johnson) made a brief return to the show in 1999, she mentioned that Fred had died of a heart attack in the interim.

Later roles
After leaving Coronation Street, Feast went on to play knackerman Jeff Mallock in a three-year stint in the BBC1 series All Creatures Great and Small, taking over from Frank Birch.

Dogged by ill health for most of the 1990s, he made a short-lived comeback starting in 1996 when Liz Dawn asked him to play the bartender in her video Liz Dawn's House Party. An appearance on the regional celebrity Yorkshire TV quiz show Cryer's Crackers followed, as did a guest role in Heartbeat in 1998. The same year he took on the small role of pigeon fancier Arthur in the hit film Little Voice, set in Scarborough and starring Brenda Blethyn, Jane Horrocks, Ewan McGregor, Michael Caine and Jim Broadbent. Feast also appeared in pantomimes, and on television chat shows during his two-year return in the public eye.

Death
Feast died of abdominal cancer on 25 June 1999, aged 69. This was less than six months after his character, Fred Gee, had been officially proclaimed as having died (offscreen) on Coronation Street, though the character had not been seen onscreen for almost 15 years.

Filmography

References

External links

Fred Feast at Corrie.net

1929 births
1999 deaths
English male soap opera actors
Actors from Scarborough, North Yorkshire
Deaths from cancer in England
20th-century English male actors
People educated at Scarborough High School for Boys